Vouk is a surname. Notable people with the surname include:

Erika Vouk (born 1941), Slovenian poet and translator
Rudi Vouk (born 1965), Austrian lawyer and politician

See also
Wouk